Milton Barnes (April 26, 1830 – June 2, 1895) was a Republican politician who was Ohio Secretary of State from 1877-1881.

Milton Barnes was born April 26, 1830 in Barnesville Belmont County, Ohio. He attended country schools and at eighteen became a teacher, and at nineteen attended Allegheny College at Meadville, Pennsylvania, but went home due to failing health. He studied law and higher mathematics at an academy at Salem, Ohio, then at a law office in Mount Vernon, Ohio, and was admitted to the bar in January, 1859. He moved to Cambridge, Ohio and opened a law office.

At the start of the American Civil War, Barnes raised a company and enlisted as captain in the Sixty-second Ohio Volunteer Infantry. This unit participated in the first Federal invasion of the Shenandoah Valley in the spring of 1862. In mid-1862, Milton returned home on sick leave, resigned his command, and re-enlisted in the Ninety-seventh Regiment as lieutenant colonel. He was twice wounded severely, and mustered out June, 1865.

In 1867 and 1869 Barnes was elected prosecuting attorney of Guernsey County. In 1876 the Republican Party nominated him for Ohio Secretary of State, and he defeated William Bell Jr. in the general election. He won re-election with a plurality over David R. Paige and two others in 1878, and did not run again.

Notes

References

Secretaries of State of Ohio
Ohio Republicans
People from Barnesville, Ohio
People from Guernsey County, Ohio
Ohio lawyers
1830 births
1895 deaths
Union Army officers
People of Ohio in the American Civil War
County district attorneys in Ohio
Allegheny College alumni
19th-century American politicians
19th-century American lawyers